Jack Stenhouse (20 November 1911 – 31 October 1987) was an Australian rules footballer who played with Richmond, Essendon and Hawthorn in the Victorian Football League (VFL).

Stenhouse, a defender from Burnley, made 13 appearances for Richmond in 1933. The last of those games was the 1933 VFL Grand Final loss to South Melbourne, which he played as a half back flanker.

He finished his league career with stints at Essendon and Hawthorn, in 1935 and 1936 respectively.

References

1911 births
Australian rules footballers from Victoria (Australia)
Richmond Football Club players
Essendon Football Club players
Hawthorn Football Club players
1987 deaths